Linda Marie Lappe (born February 26, 1980) is an American college basketball coach who most recently was women's basketball head coach at Colorado.

Early life and education
Born in Burlington, Iowa, Lappe grew up in nearby Morning Sun and attended Winfield-Mt. Union High School in Winfield.

As a freshman at Colorado in 1998–99 playing under coach Ceal Barry, Lappe led the team in scoring with 10.7 points per game. She redshirted the next season due to injuring her patella during the home opener. Lappe returned in 2000–01 as a redshirt sophomore averaging 7.0 points and 2.9 rebounds in 30 games (six starts).

As a junior in 2001–02, Lappe played 22 games and averaged 4.6 points and 2.9 points, after missing the first 11 games due to ankle surgery. In her senior season of 2002–03, Lappe started 31 of 32 games and averaged 8.4 points and 4.4 rebounds.

Coaching career
Lappe began her coaching career back in Iowa as an assistant at Drake University, a position she held from 2003 to 2006. After one season as an assistant at Colorado State, Lappe was head coach at Division II Metro State from 2007 to 2010.

In six seasons at Colorado, she compiled a record of 104-85 and guided the Buffaloes to the 2013 NCAA Women's Division I Basketball Tournament and to the WNIT in 3 other seasons. After a 7–23 season in 2015–16, Lappe resigned.  On October 18, 2016, the University of San Francisco hired Lappe as women's basketball associate head coach.  After leaving San Francisco for 2 years, Lappe returns to San Franicsco as a senior associate athletic director.

Head coaching record

References 

1980 births
Living people
American women's basketball coaches
Basketball coaches from Iowa
Basketball players from Iowa
Colorado Buffaloes women's basketball coaches
Colorado Buffaloes women's basketball players
Colorado State Rams women's basketball coaches
Drake Bulldogs women's basketball coaches
Metro State Roadrunners women's basketball coaches
People from Burlington, Iowa
People from Louisa County, Iowa
Guards (basketball)
American women's basketball players